The 2022 New York's 19th congressional district special election was a special election held on August 23, 2022. The seat became vacant after incumbent Democratic representative Antonio Delgado resigned on May 25, 2022, to become lieutenant governor of New York. Democratic nominee Pat Ryan won a slight victory over Republican nominee Marc Molinaro in what was seen as an upset due to Molinaro's lead in polls and fundraising in the weeks leading to the election.

Candidates

Democratic Party

Nominee
Pat Ryan, Ulster County executive and candidate for this district in 2018

Declined
Michelle Hinchey, state senator from the 46th district (endorsed Ryan)
Zephyr Teachout, special advisor in the office of the Attorney General of New York, Fordham University law professor; candidate for governor in 2014, nominee for this district in 2016, candidate for Attorney General in 2018 and 2022

Republican Party

Nominee
Marc Molinaro, Dutchess County executive and former state assemblyman; nominee for governor in 2018

Endorsements

General election

Predictions

Polling
Graphical summary

Generic Democrat vs. generic Republican

Fundraising

Results
Pat Ryan won the election with 66,088 votes or 51.1% of the vote compared to Marc Molinaro's 48.7% of the vote or 63,010 votes. This defied most polls, which had Molinaro winning by a somewhat comfortable margin as well as Sabato's Crystal Ball rating of Lean R. His victory can be attributed to his large margins in Ulster County. Ryan overperformed Joe Biden's 2020 margin in this district by about 0.8%. The result was considered an upset by some, as Molinaro had led by as much as 14 percentage points in public polling of the race, and Molinaro outspent Ryan on television advertising. Ryan's victory led some forecasters to change some of their predictions for the 2022 House election.

Counties that flipped from Democratic to Republican
 Dutchess (largest municipality: Poughkeepsie)
 Otsego (largest municipality: Oneonta)
 Rensselaer (largest municipality: Troy)
 Sullivan (largest municipality: Monticello)

See also
2022 United States House of Representatives elections
2022 United States elections
117th United States Congress
List of special elections to the United States House of Representatives

Notes

Partisan clients

References

New York 2022 19
New York 2022 19
2022 19 special
New York 19 Special
United States House of Representatives 19 Special
United States House of Representatives 2022 19